Ryongmun T'an'gwang station (Ryongmun Colliery station) is a railway station in Ryongmul-lodongjagu, Kujang county, North P'yŏngan province, North Korea. It is the terminus of the Ryongmun Colliery Line of the Korean State Railway.

History

The station was opened, along with the entire Ryongmun Colliery Line, by the Chosen Government Railway on 1 September 1941.

References

Railway stations in North Korea